The governor of Arkansas is the head of government of the U.S. state of Arkansas. The governor is the head of the executive branch of the Arkansas government and is charged with enforcing state laws. They have the power to either approve or veto bills passed by the Arkansas General Assembly, to convene the legislature, and to grant pardons, except in cases of treason and impeachment.

The state has had 46 elected governors, as well as 11 acting governors who assumed powers and duties following the resignation or death of the governor. Before becoming a state, Arkansas Territory had four governors appointed to it by the president of the United States. Orval Faubus (1955–1967) served the longest term as governor, being elected six times to serve 12 years. Bill Clinton (1979-1981; 1983-1992), elected five times over two distinct terms, fell only one month short of 12 years, and Mike Huckabee (1996-2007) served 10 years for two full four-year terms. The shortest term for an elected governor was the 38 days served by John Sebastian Little before his nervous breakdown; one of the acting successors to his term, Jesse M. Martin, took office only three days before the end of the term, the shortest term overall.

The current governor of Arkansas is Republican Sarah Huckabee Sanders, who was sworn in on January 10, 2023.

Territorial (1819–1836)
Arkansaw Territory (renamed Arkansas Territory, circa 1822) was split from the Missouri Territory on July 4, 1819. As territorial secretary from 1819 to 1829, Robert Crittenden served as acting governor whenever the appointed governor was not in the state. This meant that Crittenden was the first person to perform the duties of governor, since James Miller did not arrive in the territory until nine months after his appointment.

State (from 1836)
Arkansas was admitted to the Union on June 15, 1836. The state seceded on May 6, 1861, and was admitted to the Confederacy on May 18, 1861. When Little Rock, the state capital, was captured on September 10, 1863, the state government relocated to Washington, Arkansas, and a Union government was installed in its place, causing an overlap in the terms of Confederate governor Harris Flanagin and Union governor Isaac Murphy. During the post-war Reconstruction period, it was part of the Fourth Military District. Arkansas was readmitted to the Union on June 22, 1868.

The Arkansas Constitution of 1836 established four-year terms for governors, which was lowered to two years in the 1874, and current, constitution. An amendment in 1984 increased the terms of both governor and lieutenant governor to four years. Governors were originally limited only to serving no more than eight out of every twelve years, but the 1874 constitution removed any term limit. A referendum in 1992 limited governors to two terms.

Until 1864, the constitutions provided that, should the office of governor be rendered vacant, the president of the senate would serve as acting governor until such time as a new governor were elected or the disability removed, or the acting governor's senate term expired. This led to some situations where the governorship changed hands in quick succession, due to senate terms ending or new senate presidents being elected. For example, after John Sebastian Little resigned in 1907, 3 senate presidents acted as governor before the next elected governor took office. Should the president of the senate be similarly incapacitated, the next in line for the governorship was the speaker of the state house of representatives.

The 1864 constitution created the office of lieutenant governor who would also act as president of the senate, and who would serve as acting governor in case of vacancy. The 1868 constitution maintained the position, but the 1874 constitution removed it and returned to the original line of succession. An amendment to the constitution, passed in 1914 but not recognized until 1925, recreated the office of lieutenant governor, who becomes governor in case of vacancy of the governor's office. The governor and lieutenant governor are not elected on the same ticket.

Arkansas was a strongly Democratic state before the Civil War, electing only candidates from the Democratic party. It elected three Republican governors following Reconstruction, but after the Democratic Party re-established control, 92 years passed before voters chose another Republican. Arkansas has 7 Republican governors, 39 Democratic and 3 independent.

Notes

References

General

 
 
 
 
 

Constitutions

 
 
 
 
 

Specific

External links

Official
 
 General information
 
 Governors of Arkansas at The Political Graveyard
 

 
Governor
Governors
Arkansas